Crossotus vagepictus is a species of beetle in the family Cerambycidae. It was described by Fairmaire in 1886. It contains the varietas Crossotus vagepictus var. niveicollis.

References

vagepictus
Beetles described in 1886